Istu Chah (also Romanized as Īstu Chāh) is a village in Dokuheh Rural District, Seh Qaleh District, Sarayan County, South Khorasan Province, Iran. At the 2006 census, its population was 93, in 21 families.

References 

Populated places in Sarayan County